Gnaviyani (sometimes spelt Nyaviyani) can refer to:

Gnaviyani Atoll, an administrative division of the Maldives.
Gnaviyani ( ޏ ), the 16th consonant of the Thaana alphabet used in Dhivehi. It is located between letters Gaafu and Seenu.